The Premio Chiusura is a Listed flat horse race in Italy open to thoroughbreds aged two years or older. It is run at Milan over a distance of 1,400 metres (about 7 furlongs), and it is scheduled to take place each year in late October or early November.

The event is traditionally held during Milan's last flat racing fixture of the year. The English translation of its title is Closing Prize.

The Premio Chiusura was given Group 2 status in the 1970s. It was relegated to Group 3 level in 1988 and downgraded to Listed status in 2017.

Records
Most successful horse since 1971 (3 wins):
 Salselon – 2001, 2002, 2003

Leading jockey since 1986 (3 wins):
 Giovanni Forte – Lavinia Fontana (1994, 1995), Salselon (2001)

Leading trainer since 1986 (4 wins):
 John Dunlop – Efisio (1987), Alquoz (1989), Lavinia Fontana (1994, 1995)

Winners since 1986

Earlier winners
 1971: Alcamo
 1972: Calahorra
 1973: Brook
 1974: Carnauba
 1975: Raga Navarro
 1976: Ovac
 1977: Capo Sunion
 1978: Croda Alta
 1979: Absalom
 1980: Esclavo
 1981: Emkar
 1982: no race
 1983: Nandino
 1984: Capricorn Belle
 1985: Life on Mars

See also
 List of Italian flat horse races

References

 Racing Post:

 galopp-sieger.de – Premio Chiusura.
 horseracingintfed.com – International Federation of Horseracing Authorities – Premio Chiusura (2016).
 pedigreequery.com – Premio Chiusura – Milano San Siro.

Horse races in Italy
Open mile category horse races
Sport in Milan